{{DISPLAYTITLE:C11H19N3O6}}
The molecular formula C11H19N3O6 (molar mass: 289.285 g/mol) may refer to:

 Ophthalmic acid
 Tabtoxin, or wildfire toxin

Molecular formulas